Holt-Harrison House is a historic home located at Fayetteville, Cumberland County, North Carolina. It was built about 1897, and is a two-story, three bay, hip roofed, Colonial Revival style frame dwelling. It has a double-pile central-hall plan, and a two-story portico that is a replacement.

It was listed on the National Register of Historic Places in 1983.

References

Houses on the National Register of Historic Places in North Carolina
Colonial Revival architecture in North Carolina
Houses completed in 1897
Houses in Fayetteville, North Carolina
National Register of Historic Places in Cumberland County, North Carolina